Lodolo is a surname. Notable people with the surname include:

 Massimo Lodolo (born 1959), Italian actor and voice actor
 Nick Lodolo (born 1998), American professional baseball pitcher